David I. "Dave" Bitner (December 11, 1948 – September 8, 2011) was an American Republican politician from Florida. He served in the Florida House of Representatives. He was first elected to the Florida House in 1992.

Early years
Bitner was born in Hagerstown, Maryland.

Education
Bitner graduated from the North Hagerstown High School. Bitner was chairman of the Republican Party of Florida. He served in the Florida House of Representatives.

Personal information
Bitner and his family currently reside in Port Charlotte. Along with being a politician, Bitner was also a small business owner.

Family
Bitner had one daughter named Jennifer Virginia.

Religion
Bitner was a Baptist.

Recreational Interest
In his free time, he enjoyed golf, fishing, hunting, and baseball-card collecting.

Death

Bitner died September 8, 2011, after a months-long battle with amyotrophic lateral sclerosis (ALS) (sometimes called Lou Gehrig's disease).

References

|-

Politicians from Hagerstown, Maryland
Republican Party members of the Florida House of Representatives
1948 births
2011 deaths
Neurological disease deaths in Florida
Deaths from motor neuron disease
State political party chairs of Florida